Fome Is Dape is the only studio album by American hip hop duo Little-T and One Track Mike. It was released in 2001 via Lava Records.

The single, "Shaniqua," was a hit. It made the top ten on MTV's TRL.

Critical reception
The Honolulu Star-Bulletin called the album "one of the year's more pleasant surprises."

Track listing
 Intro – 1:11
 "Fome Is Dape" – 3:19
 "Immune" – 3:25
 "Wings" – 4:05
 "Loosendin'" – 3:48
 "Kick in the Ass" – 4:01
 "Sammy" – 4:04
 "A Little More" – 3:40 featuring Shank Bone Mystic
 "Untitled" – 0:20
 "J" – 3:20
 "Only When It Rains" – 3:29
 "Guidance Counselor" – 3:01 featuring Slick Rick
 "Shaniqua" – 3:15
 "Deadman" – 4:01 featuring Shank Bone Mystic
 "Sycamore Trees" – 4:19
 "Outro" – 10:36
 Includes the hidden track "Little-T and One Track Mike Are Famous," beginning at 6:00 into the song.

Sampler track listings

Sampler 1
 "Fome Is Dape"
 "Loosendin'"

Sampler 2
 "Intro"  (0:51)
 "Guidance Counselor" (3:23)
 "Loosendin'" (4:36)

References

2001 debut albums
Lava Records albums
Little-T and One Track Mike albums